Marouan Toutouh (May 10, 1994) is a Moroccan-Dutch kickboxer. A professional competitor since 2014, Toutouh is the 2018 Enfusion Abu Dhabi -72.5kg Tournament runner-up and the 2019 Kunlun Fight World Max -70kg Tournament runner-up.

Kickboxing career

Kunlun Fight
Toutouh took part in the 2017 Kunlun Fight lightweight qualifying tournament, held at Kunlun Fight 59 on March 25, 2017. Toutouh faced Janis Ziedins in the semifinal bout and won it by a first-round knockout. Toutouh faced Khayal Dzhaniev in the final bout of the one-day tournament, and won it by technical knockout, as Dzhaniev retired from the bout in the third round.

Before taking part in the 2017 KLF final tournament, Toutouh was booked to face Davit Kiria at Kunlun Fight 63 on June 24, 2017. He won the fight by majority decision, after an extra round was fought. The pair fought an immediate rematch in the opening round of the 2017 KLF MAX tournament, held Kunlun Fight 65 on August 27, 2017. Kiria won their second meeting by unanimous decision.

Toutouh faced the two-time K-1 World MAX champion Buakaw Banchamek at Kunlun Fight 67 on November 12, 2017. He lost the fight by a first-round knockout. Toutouh briefly left Kunlun Fight, as he was booked to face Jamal Yusupov at Wu Lin Feng 2018: -60kg World Championship Tournament on March 10, 2018, in his next bout. He won the fight by decision.

Toutouh fought in the 2018 Kunlun Fight lightweight qualifying tournament as well, held at Kunlun Fight 72 on April 15, 2018. Toutouh earned his place in the finals, where he faced Milan Pales, after beating Nayanesh Ayman by decision in the semifinals. Toutouh beat Pales by a third-round technical knockout.

Toutouh made his Enfusion debut against Armen Hovhannisian at Enfusion #69 on June 23, 2018. Toutouh next faced Niclas Larsen at Kunlun Fight 75 in the opening round of the 2018 Kunlun Fight MAX tournament. He won the fight by unanimous decision. Toutouh faced Anatoly Moiseev in the tournament quarterfinals, held at  Kunlun Fight 77: Hollow Throne on October 13, 2018. He won the fight by unanimous decision.

Enfusion
Toutouh took part in the 2018 Enfusion 72.5 kg tournament, held at Enfustion 76 on December 7, 2018. Toutouh faced Endy Semeleer in the tournament quarterfinals. Despite losing to Semeleer by unanimous decision, he nonetheless advanced to the semifinals, where he faced Cedric Do, as Semeleer was unable to continue competing due to injury. Toutouh beat Do by a third-round technical knockout and advanced to the tournament finals, where he faced Superbon Banchamek. Superbon won the fight by unanimous decision.

Toutouh faced Dzianis Zuev at Kunlun Fight 80 on February 24, 2019, in the semifinals of the Kunlun Fight MAX. He won the fight by unanimous decision and advanced to the tournament finals, where he fought a rubber match with Davit Kiria. Kiria won the fight by split decision.

Toutouh challenged the reigning Enfusion 75kg champion Endy Semeleer at Enfusion #85 on June 8, 2019. He lost the fight by unanimous decision.

Toutouh faced Nikos Papanikolaou at Gala Kickboxing Fearless 9 on November 3, 2019. He won the fight by a first-round technical knockout. Toutouh faced Imad Assli at Enfusion 93 on December 6, 2019, in his final fight of the year. He won the fight by disqualification, after being tackled out of the ring onto the judges' table by Assli in the third round.

ONE Championship
On May 5, 2022, it was announced by his promotional company that Toutouh had signed with ONE Championship. He was scheduled to make his ONE debut against Constantin Rusu at ONE 158 on June 3, 2022. He lost the fight by unanimous decision.

Toutouh faced Nikola Todorović at Senshi 15 on February 18, 2023. He lost the fight by a second-round knockout.

Titles and accomplishments
Kunlun Fight
2019 Kunlun Fight World Max -70kg Tournament Runner-up
Enfusion
2018 Enfusion Live Abu Dhabi -72.5kg Tournament Runner-up
World Full Contact Association
2015 WFCA Benelux -72.5kg Champion

Kickboxing record

|-  style="background:#fbb;"
| 2023-02-28 || Loss ||align=left| Nikola Todorović || Senshi 15 ||  Varna, Bulgaria || KO (Knee) || 2 ||2:44
|-  style="background:#fbb;"
| 2022-06-03 || Loss||align=left| Constantin Rusu || ONE 158 ||  Kallang, Singapore || Decision (Unanimous)|| 3 ||3:00
|-  bgcolor="#CCFFCC"
| 2019-12-06 || Win ||align=left| Imad Assli || Enfusion 93 ||  Abu Dhabi, United Arab Emirates || DQ || 3 ||
|-  bgcolor="#CCFFCC"
| 2019-11-03 || Win ||align=left| Nikos Papanikolaou || Gala Kickboxing Fearless 9 ||  Netherlands || TKO (Doctor Stoppage) || 1 ||
|-  bgcolor="#FFBBBB"
| 2019-06-08 || Loss||align=left| Endy Semeleer || Enfusion #85 ||  Groningen, Netherlands || Decision (Unanimous) || 5 || 3:00 
|-
! style=background:white colspan=9 |
|- style="background:#FFBBBB;"
|  2019-02-24 || Loss|| align="left" | Davit Kiria || Kunlun Fight 80, Final ||Shanghai, China || Decision (Split) || 3 || 3:00
|-
! style=background:white colspan=9 |For the Kunlun Fight World Max Tournament title
|-  style="background:#CCFFCC;"
|  2019-02-24 || Win || align="left" | Dzianis Zuev || Kunlun Fight 80, Semi Finals || Shanghai, China || Decision (Unanimous) || 3 || 3:00
|-  style="background:#FFBBBB;"
| 2018-12-07 || Loss ||align=left| Superbon Banchamek || Enfusion Live 76 - 72.5kg 8 Man Tournament, Final ||  Abu Dhabi, United Arab Emirates || Decision (Unanimous) || 3 || 3:00 
|-
! style=background:white colspan=9 |
|-  bgcolor="#CCFFCC"
| 2018-12-07 || Win ||align=left| Cedric Do || Enfusion Live 76 - 72.5kg 8 Man Tournament, Semi Finals ||  Abu Dhabi, United Arab Emirates || TKO  || 3 ||
|-  bgcolor="#FFBBBB"
| 2018-12-07 || Loss ||align=left| Endy Semeleer || Enfusion Live 76 - 72.5kg 8 Man Tournament, Quarter Finals ||  Abu Dhabi, United Arab Emirates || Decision (Unanimous) || 3 || 3:00 
|-
! style=background:white colspan=9 |
|-  bgcolor="#CCFFCC"
|  2018-11-17 || Win|| align="left" | Regilio Van Den Ent || Enfusion #74, Final ||Groningen, Netherlands||Decision  ||3|| 3:00
|-
! style=background:white colspan=9 |
|-  bgcolor="#CCFFCC"
|  2018-11-17 || Win|| align="left" | Yassin Baitar || Enfusion #74, Semi Final ||Groningen, Netherlands||Decision  ||3|| 3:00
|-  bgcolor="#CCFFCC"
|  2018-10-13 || Win || align="left" |  Anatoly Moiseev || Kunlun Fight 77: Hollow Throne (Quarter Finals) ||Tongling, China||Decision (Unanimous)||3|| 3:00
|-  bgcolor="#CCFFCC"
|  2018-08-05 || Win|| align="left" | Niclas Larsen || Kunlun Fight 75 1/8 Finals ||China||Decision (Unanimous) ||3|| 3:00
|-  bgcolor="#CCFFCC"
|  2018-06-23 || Win|| align="left" | Armen Hovhannisian || Enfusion #69  ||Groningen, Netherlands|| Decision||3|| 3:00
|-  bgcolor="#CCFFCC"
|  2018-04-15 || Win|| align="left" | Milan Pales || Kunlun Fight 72 Qualifying Round, Final  ||China|| TKO (Knees) || 3 || 1:41
|-  bgcolor="#c5d2ea"
|  2018-04-15 || Draw || align="left" | Nayanesh Ayman || Kunlun Fight 72 Qualifying Round, Semi Final  ||China||Decision ||3|| 3:00
|-
! style=background:white colspan=9 |
|-  style="background:#CCFFCC;"
| 2018-03-10 || Win||align=left| Jamal Yusupov || Wu Lin Feng 2018: -60kg World Championship Tournament || Jiaozuo, China || Decision || 3 || 3:00
|-  style="background:#FFBBBB;"
| 2017-11-12 || Loss ||align=left| Buakaw Banchamek || Kunlun Fight 67 || Sanya, China || KO (Left hook) || 2 || 1:03
|-  style="background:#FFBBBB;"
| 2017-08-27|| Loss ||align=left| Davit Kiria || kunlun Fight 65 – 70 kg World Max 2017  Tournament 1/8 Finals || Qingdao, China || Decision (Unanimous) || 3 || 3:00
|-
|-  style="background:#CCFFCC;"
| 2017-06-24 || Win ||align=left| Davit Kiria || Kunlun Fight 63  || Sanya, China || Ext. R Decision (Majority) || 4 || 3:00
|-  style="background:#CCFFCC;"
| 2017-03-25 || Win ||align=left| Khayal Dzhaniev || Kunlun Fight 59 70 kg Qualifier Tournament 5 Final  || Sanya, China || TKO (Retirement) || 3 || 3:00
|-  style="background:#CCFFCC;"
| 2017-03-25 || Win ||align=left| Janis Ziedins || Kunlun Fight 59 70 kg Qualifier Tournament 5 Semi-Final B || Sanya, China || KO (Knee) || 1 || 1:04
|-  style="background:#CCFFCC;"
| 2017-02-25 || Win||align=left| Zakaria Baitar || Enfusion Rookies||  Alphen aan den Rijn, Netherlands || Decision  || 3 || 3:00
|-  style="background:#FFBBBB;"
| 2016-10-21 || Loss||align=left| Mirkko Moisar || XFS ||  Estonia || Ext.R Decision  || 4 || 0:00
|-  style="background:#CCFFCC;"
| 2016-09-24 || Win ||align=left| Nordin van Roosmalen || Battle events  || Arnhem, Netherlands ||  Decision  || 3 || 3:00
|-  style="background:#CCFFCC;"
| 2016-06-04 || Win ||align=left| Hasan Toy || King of The Ring || Netherlands ||  Decision  || 3 || 3:00
|-  style="background:#FFBBBB;"
| 2015-11-28 || Loss||align=left| Redouan Laarkoubi || Fightsense, Final|| Netherlands ||  Ext.R Decision  || 4 || 3:00
|-  style="background:#CCFFCC;"
| 2015-11-28 || Win ||align=left| Samir Kasrioui|| Fightsense, Semi Final|| Netherlands ||   Decision  || 3 || 3:00
|-  style="background:#CCFFCC;"
| 2015-10-31 || Win ||align=left| Marcel Verhaar|| King of the Ring|| Netherlands ||  Decision  || 3 || 3:00
|-
! style=background:white colspan=9 |
|-  style="background:#FFBBBB;"
| 2015-06-06 || Loss||align=left| Angar Nassr|| Enfusion Fighting Rookies|| Eindhoven, Netherlands ||  Ext.R Decision  || 4 || 3:00
|-  style="background:#FFBBBB;"
| 2014-12 || Loss||align=left| Yahya Alemdağ || Oneshot || Turkey ||  Decision  || 3 || 3:00
|-  style="background:#CCFFCC;"
| 2014-10-04 || Win ||align=left| Karakurt Kendal || Battle of Arnhem || Arnhem, Netherlands ||  Decision  || 3 || 3:00
|-
| colspan=9 | Legend:

See also
 List of male kickboxers

References

Living people
1994 births
Moroccan male kickboxers
Kunlun Fight kickboxers
ONE Championship kickboxers 
Dutch male kickboxers